The Amazar is a river in Zabaykalsky Krai, Russia.

The name originated in the Evenki language, meaning "mouth in the ground".

A stretch of the Trans-Siberian Railway runs along the valley of the Amazar with Mogocha, Razdolnaya, Taptugary and Semiozerny stations located near the river.

The Amazar is the river in Transbaikalia where salmon are more abundant.

Course  

The Amazar is a left tributary of the Amur. It is formed in the slopes of the Cheromny Range, Olyokma-Stanovik Highlands, at the confluence of the Big Amazar (Bolshoy Amazar) and Small Amazar (Maly Amazar). In its upper course it flows roughly southeastwards across mountainous terrain, forming the northern limit of the Amazar Range. The river bed is subject to human interference in certain stretches, where it is dredged for the extraction of alluvial minerals, affecting natural biodiversity. Downstream from the confluence of the Bolshoi Chichatka, the Amazar crosses the Amazar Range. Further down the river forms large bends and in some stretches there are lakes in the floodplain. Some of the rocky shore areas are picturesque, but the scars of gold mining are quite apparent. Finally the bottom of the valley expands and the Amazar joins the Amur  from its mouth.

The river freezes to the bottom between October and late April or early May.

See also
List of rivers of Russia

References

External links 

Rivers of Zabaykalsky Krai